James Arledge Armenaki (born December 28, 1949) is an American cinematographer and professor.

Biography
Armenaki was born in Portland, Oregon, the son of a United States Navy pilot. Due to his father's career, he grew up in various locations, primarily in Morocco and London, England.

Between 1973 and 1976 he studied at Brooks Institute of Photography. The blaxploitation Disco Godfather was his first movie shot as a director of photography. Next to his cinematography-career he taught at Brooks Institute of Photography (1990−1995), North Carolina School of the Arts (1995−2005) and since 2005 as an associate professor at Western Carolina University.

Selected filmography

References

External links
 

American cinematographers
1949 births
Living people
Artists from Portland, Oregon
Brooks Institute alumni
North Carolina School of the Arts faculty
Western Carolina University faculty